Jack L. Curnow (31 January 1910 – 1990) was an English professional footballer. A goalkeeper, he played in the Football League for Wolves, Tranmere Rovers and Hull City.

References

1910 births
1990 deaths
People from Lingdale
English footballers
Association football goalkeepers
Wolverhampton Wanderers F.C. players
Blackpool F.C. players
Tranmere Rovers F.C. players
Hull City A.F.C. players
English Football League players
Footballers from North Yorkshire